Thrikkakara State assembly constituency is one of the 140 state legislative assembly constituencies in Kerala state in southern India. It is also one of the 7 state legislative assembly constituencies included in the Ernakulam Lok Sabha constituency.
 After 2022 by-polls, Uma Thomas of INC became the  MLA.

Local self governed segments
Thrikkakara Niyama Sabha constituency is composed of the following 22 wards of the Kochi Municipal Corporation (Edappally zone and Vyttila zone), and 1 Municipality in Kanayannur Taluk:

All of the above 22 wards are included in the Kanayannur Taluk.

Members of Legislative Assembly 
The following list contains all members of Kerala legislative assembly who have represented the constituency:

^ by-poll

Election results 

Percentage change (±%) denotes the change in the number of votes from the immediate previous election.

By-election 2022

Niyamasabha Election 2016 
There were 1,81,261 registered voters in the constituency for the 2016 Kerala Niyamasabha Election.

Niyamasabha Election 2011 
There were 1,59,877 registered voters in the constituency for the 2011 election.

See also
 Thrikkakara
 Ernakulam district
 List of constituencies of the Kerala Legislative Assembly
 2016 Kerala Legislative Assembly election

References 

Assembly constituencies of Kerala

State assembly constituencies in Ernakulam district